The European Medicines Verification Organisation was established by the European Commission to administer the Falsified Medicines Directive in 2015.  The legal basis is Regulation (EC) No. 726/2004 and Directive 2001/83/EC.

The main stakeholders are:
European Federation of Pharmaceutical Industries and Associations
Medicines for Europe
European Association of Euro-Pharmaceutical Companies
European Healthcare Distribution Association
Pharmaceutical Group of the European Union
European Association of Hospital Pharmacists
European Hospital and Healthcare Federation

All prescription medicines must have a unique Identifier, which is imbedded in a two-dimensional data-matrix and packaging must have a tamper verification feature. The organisation maintains a database of unique identifiers supplied pharmaceutical suppliers in respect of each unit of sale package they manufacture or repackage.  This is to contain:

 Product code
 Randomized serial number
 Expiration date
 Batch or lot number
 National Health Reimbursement Number if required 

In August 2018 it warned that only 841 of the 2,291 pharmaceutical companies with marketing authorisations to supply prescription medicines to the European Economic Area had completed the first stage of connection to the EU Hub, which may take up to six months.

The system went live on 9 February 2019.

References

External References
The Official website of the European Medicines Verification Organisation

Agencies of the European Union
European medical and health organizations
Regulators of biotechnology products
Regulation in the European Union